Loes Ypma  (born 20 February 1980) is a Dutch politician. As a member of the Labour Party (Partij van de Arbeid) she was an MP between 20 September 2012 and 23 March 2017. Previously she was a member of the municipal council of Woerden from 2001 to 2007 and subsequently an alderman of the same municipality from 2007 to 2012.

References

External links 
 

1980 births
Aldermen in Utrecht (province)
People from Woerden
Dutch management consultants
Labour Party (Netherlands) politicians
Living people
Members of the House of Representatives (Netherlands)
Municipal councillors in Utrecht (province)
University of Amsterdam alumni
Politicians from Rotterdam
21st-century Dutch politicians
21st-century Dutch women politicians